The acronym OPEX may refer to:

 Operating expense
 Operational excellence
 OPEX (Stock Exchange)
 OPEX (Corporation)
 OPtions EXpiration
 Opérations Extérieures, overseas operations of the French Military.